Garuda is a municipality in Rautahat District in the Narayani Zone of south-eastern Nepal. It is a newly created municipality by merging 7 former Village development committees namely Garuda Bairiya, Malahi, Basbiti Jingadiya, Gedahiguthi, Jayanagar, Mahamadpur and Pothiyahi.

One of the biggest sugar mill of Nepal, "Shree Ram Sugar Mills", is situated here.

Geography

Garuda Municipality lies in plain of Terai region of Nepal. The land, here is fertile and humus containing.

Climate

The Garuda Municipality has a humid, tropical climate. More than 80% of the total annual rainfall occurs during the monsoon season from June to September.

In the past, the inner and outer Terai were a formidable barrier between Nepal and potential invaders from India because marshes and forests were infested by anopheline mosquitos that transmitted virulent strains of malaria, especially during the hot spring and rainy summer monsoon.

There are several differences between the climate on the eastern edge of the Terai at Biratnagar in Nepal and on the western edge of the Terai at Nepaljung in Nepal to that of Garuda Municipality in Nepal although they lies in same plain of Terai.

 Moving inland and away from monsoon sources in the Bay of Bengal, the climate becomes more continental with a greater difference between summer and winter.
 In the far western Terai, which is five degrees latitude further north, the coldest months' average is  cooler.
 Total rainfall markedly diminishes from east to west. The monsoon arrives later, is much less intense and ends sooner. However, winters are wetter in the west.au in Nepal near the central edge although both lies in Terai.
 Moving inland and away from monsoon sources in the Bay of Bengal, the climate becomes more continental with a greater difference between summer and winter.
 In the far western Terai, which is five degrees latitude further north, the coldest months' average is  cooler.
 Total rainfall markedly diminishes from east to west. The monsoon arrives later, is much less intense and ends sooner. However, winters are wetter in the west.

Madhya Rautahat Multiple Campus, Garuda Birta

Shree Higher Secondary School, Garuda
This school offers education up to 12th class and follow the curriculum of Government School of Nepal.

Shree Mid Regional Police Boarding High School, Basbitti Jingadiya
This is one of a regional system of Nepal Police School in Nepal. This school also offers education up to 12th class and follow the curriculum of Government School of Nepal.

Transport
It is the mid of Gaur-Chandranigahpur Highway which starts from Gaur and joins to East-West Highway  in Chandrapur connecting this place to all major cities of Nepal.

It is 22 km north of Gaur and 20 km south of Chandrapur.

The transport facility is reliable. All the buses starting from Gaur and heading towards capital of Nepal, Kathmandu, and other major cities like Birgunj, Janakpurdham, Pokhara, Biratnagar, Nepalgunj, Bharatpur, etc. stop here as a next hub of passengers.

The nearest domestic airport, Simara Airport, is in Simra while nearest International airport,  Nijgadh International Airport, is under construction in Nijgadh.

One can reach to all major cities of India using Indian Railways available at Bairgania via Gaur.

Economy
This place gained its fortune after the Gaur-Chandranigahpur Highway was constructed. After the highway construction, developments and infrastructures followed around these areas. In 1994 A.D. Shree Ram Sugar Mill was erected in Garuda. With the establishment of the sugar industry, farmers had opportunity to open business with the factory. They increased their sugarcane farming and sold it to the factory in their backyard. The factory provided jobs and opened sources of business in this place.

Today the place is the fastest growing market of Rautahat district with every business one can name. It has highest economic rate among all villages in its districts. Some of the major people like Jaiswal, Sharma, etc are well known for their business standard in Garuda. It is the center of business in the area with few banks, five-six petrol pumps, hundreds of Grocery stores, handful of Shopping centers, small granary and Eating-oil mills, shoes factory, several restaurants, clinics and Area police station (Ilaka prahari karyalaya).
Approximately more than 50% of the people are involved in farming and some other engaged in Business or other traditional works.

References

Populated places in Rautahat District
Nepal municipalities established in 2014
Municipalities in Madhesh Province